Marco Andrés Estrada Quinteros (born 28 May 1983) is a Chilean former football midfielder.

Career
He was called up for the Chile national football team's friendlies against the two hosting nations of the 2008 Euro Cup. Against Switzerland, Chile lost 2–1 but had a legitimate goal called off and Austria, where Chile comfortably won 2–0. Both of these encounters were played on 7 September 2007 and 11 September 2007 in  Austria. After two great performances Estrada was called up for two friendlies in Asia against Japan, where Chile held the hosts to a 0–0 draw and South Korea, where Chile won 1–0.

It was then where Estrada's aerial ability, marking, tenacity, powerful shots, long pass accuracy and technique continued to impress prestigious Chile's coach, Marcelo Bielsa who nominated him for the Bolivia and Venezuela games. Both matches were played in tough scenarios in the 3600 meter altitude Hernando Siles Stadium in La Paz and the Copa America 2007 Puerto Ordaz Stadium in Venezuela. Chile surprisingly won both games 2–0 and 3–2. Estrada proved to be extremely consistent in both matches, playing as a left wing back and a centre back and went on to be a regular in the Chile national team during three years. Estrada scored his first International goal on Wednesday 10 June. when his curling free kick beat Bolivian goalkeeper Carlo Arias after midfielder Ignacio Garcia of Bolivia was sent off in the 71st minute. Estrada replaced the suspended Carlos Carmona in the starting line up Chile's final Group H match at the 2010 FIFA World Cup, but was sent off for a foul on Fernando Torres in the lead up to their opponent's Spain's second goal in a 2–1 win.

Career statistics

International goals

Post retirement
Following his retirement, Estrada played at amateur championships in clubs such as Juventud El Bajío from Quillota. In addition, he opened a sports complex in his city of birth along with the former footballer Jean Beausejour in 2016.

Honours
Everton
 Primera B de Chile (1): 2003

Universidad de Chile
 Primera División de Chile (1): 2009 Apertura

Montpellier
 Ligue 1 (1): 2011–12

San Luis
 Primera B de Chile (1): 2014–15

References

1983 births
Living people
People from Quillota
Association football midfielders
Chilean footballers
Primera B de Chile players
Chilean Primera División players
Ligue 1 players
UAE Pro League players
Everton de Viña del Mar footballers
Universidad de Chile footballers
Montpellier HSC players
Al Wahda FC players
San Luis de Quillota footballers
Chilean expatriate footballers
Chilean expatriate sportspeople in France
Chilean expatriate sportspeople in the United Arab Emirates
Expatriate footballers in France
Expatriate footballers in the United Arab Emirates
Chile international footballers
2010 FIFA World Cup players
2011 Copa América players